Understated is the eighth solo album by the Scottish singer/songwriter Edwyn Collins, released 25 March 2013 on AED Records.

It reached number 66 in the UK album charts upon its week.

Track listing 
  "Dilemma" - 3:26
  "Baby Jean" - 3:27
  "Carry On, Carry On" - 4:05
  "31 Years" - 3:58
  "It's a Reason" - 4:06
  "Too Bad (That's Sad)" - 3:20
  "Down the Line" - 4:28
  "Forsooth" - 4:10
  "In the Now" - 3:46
  "Understated" - 3:01
  "Love's Been Good to Me" - 3:21

Charts

References

Edwyn Collins albums
2013 albums
Albums produced by Edwyn Collins